An Introduction To Rhyme is a book by Peter Dale which was published by Agenda/Bellew in 1998. The first chapter gives a detailed and comprehensive categorization of forty types of rhyme available in English.

Traditional pure rhyme
Dale identifies the following varieties of Traditional Pure Rhyme:
 Single Pure Rhyme (example: cat / mat)
 Double Pure Rhyme (example: silly / Billy)
 Triple Pure Rhyme (example: mystery / history)
 Eye rhyme (example: love / move)
 Near rhyme (example: breath / deaf)
 Wrenched stress rhyme (example: bent / firmament)
 Wrenched Sense Rhyme

Pararhyme
Dale identifies the following varieties of Pararhyme:
 Single Pararhyme (example: hill / Hell)
 Double Pararhyme (example: Satan / satin)
 Triple Pararhyme (example: summery / Samurai)
 Double Pararhyme Mixed Form (example: lover / liver)
 Triple Pararhyme Mixed Form (example: mystery / mastery)
 Near Pararhyme (example: live / leaf)

Assonance rhyme
Dale identifies the following varieties of Assonance Rhyme:
 Single Assonance with Head Rhyme (example: feast / feed)
 Double Assonance with Head Rhyme (example: fever / feature)
 Triple Assonance with Head Rhyme (example: rosary / ropery)

Pure assonance rhyme
 Single Pure Assonance Rhyme (example: leaves / feast)
 Double Pure Assonance Rhyme (example: babies / lady)
 Triple Pure Assonance Rhyme (example: Cerements / temperance)

Consonance rhyme
Dale identifies the following types of Consonance rhyme:
 Head rhyme (example: leaves / lance)
 Final consonance also known as Half rhyme (example: spot / cut)

Syllable rhyme
Dale identifies the following types of syllable rhyme:
 Pure Syllable Rhyme (example: belfry / selfish)
 Syllable Pararhyme (example: tractive / truckle)
 Syllable Assonance (example: shadow / matter)
 Syllable Assonance with Head Rhyme (example: shadow / shackle);

Uneven rhyme
Dale describes three types of Uneven Rhyme:
 Simple Uneven Rhyme (example: ten / oven)
 Uneven Rhyme combined with Pararhyme (example: pen / open)
 Uneven Rhyme with Reduced Stress (example: house-boat / top-coat)

Other types of rhyme
Dale also identifies the following types of rhyme:
 Light rhyme (rhyme on unstressed syllables; example: shallow / minnow')
 Consonant chime (example from Dylan Thomas: ferrule / folly / angle / valley / coral / mile)
 Alternation (alternation of masculine and feminine endings, a sort of rhythmic rhyme)
 Analytic rhyme (complex patterns, example of pararhyme abba and assonance abab in Auden: began / flush / flash / gun)
 Off-centred rhyme (placing rhyme in unexpected places mid-line)
 Mirror rhyme (example: nude / dune)
 Generic rhyme (rhyme based on phonetic groups of consonants; example: father / harder / carver)
 Cynghanedd
 Echo rhyme (example, line ending in disease? Ease.'')
 Identity rhyme (repetition of word)
 Repetition (repetition of line)
 Spatial rhyme

1998 non-fiction books
Books about poetry
Rhyme